Edward Stewart Kennedy (3 January 1912 in Mexico City – 4 May 2009 in Doylestown, Pennsylvania) was a historian of science specializing in medieval Islamic astronomical tables written in Persian and Arabic.

Edward S. Kennedy studied electrical engineering at Lafayette College, graduating in 1932. He then traveled to Iran to teach at Alborz College, at that time directed by the American Presbyterian Mission. In the Persian language environment, Kennedy made a study of Persian and became fluent in the language. After four years he returned to Pennsylvania and took up study of series of exponential form related to Lambert series while at Lehigh University. He graduated Ph.D. in 1939.

When war broke out he enlisted with the US Army and was sent to Tehran to serve as an attaché, given his fluency in Persian. After the war he saw Sarton and Neugebauer at Harvard as he had taken an interest in early Persian and Arabic science. Then he began to  teach at the American University in Beirut (1946 to 1976). In 1951 he married Mary Helen Scanlon and together they had 3 children: Anna, Michael, and Nora. He participated at the American Research Center in Egypt until 1978 when he joined the Institute for the History of Arab Science at University of Aleppo. Edward and Mary-Helen left Lebanon in 1984.

Kennedy died in Doylestown, Pennsylvania at the age of 97.

Publications 
 1956: A survey of Islamic astronomical tables, Transactions of the American Philosophical Society, N. S. Vol. 46, Part 2.  
 1959: (with Mohammad Saffouri & Adnan Ifram), Al-Bīrūnī on Transits. Beirut: American University of Beirut, reprinted 1988: Frankfurt am Main: Institut für Geschichte der Arabisch-Islamischen Wissenschaften, Islamic Mathematics and Astronomy 33
 1960: The Planetary Equatorium of Jamshīd Ghiyāth al-Dīn al-Kāshī (d. 1429). Princeton University Press
 1968: "The Exact Sciences in Iran under the Saljuqs and Mongols," in The Cambridge History of Iran Volume 5: The Saljuq and Mongol Periods, edited by J. A. Boyle. Cambridge University Press, 
 1969: "The History of Trigonometry", chapter 6 of Historical Topics for the Mathematics Classroom, Washington DC: National Council of Teachers of Mathematics
 1970: "The Arabic Heritage in the Exact Sciences," Al-Abhath 23: 327–344.
 1971: (with David Pingree) The Astrological History of Mā'shā'allāh. Cambridge MA: Harvard University Press 
 1973: A Commentary upon Bīrunī's Kitaāb Taādīd [Nihāyāt] al-Amākin – An 11th century treatise on mathematical geography. Beirut: American University of Beirut Reprinted 1992: Frankfurt am Main: Institut für Geschichte der Arabisch-Islamischen Wissenschaften
 1975: "The Exact Sciences during the Abbasid Period," in The Cambridge History of Iran Volume 4: The Period from the Arab Invasion to the Saljuqs, ed. Richard Nelson Frye, Cambridge University Press 
 1976: The Exhaustive Treatise on Shadows by Abu al-Rayḥān Muḥammad b. Aḥmad al-Bīrūnī, 2 volumes, University of Aleppo, Institute for the History of Arabic Science
 1976: (edited with Imad Ghanem) The Life & Work of Ibn al-Shāṭir--An Arab Astronomer of the Fourteenth Century. Aleppo: University of Aleppo, Institute for the History of Arabic Science
 1981: (translated with Fuad I. Haddad, commentary with David E. Pingree) The Book of the Reasons Behind Astronomical Tables (Kitāb fi 'ilal al-ziījāt) by 'Ali ibn Sulayman al-Hashimi. New York: Scholars' Facsimiles & Reprints, Delmar
 1986: "The Exact Sciences in Timurid Iran," in The Cambridge History of Iran volume 6: The Timurid and Savafid Periods, edited by Peter Jackson & Lawrence Lockhart. Cambridge University Press 
 1987: (with Mary Helen Kennedy) Geographical Coordinates of Localities from Islamic Sources. Frankfurt am Main: Institut für Geschichte der Arabisch-Islamischen Wissenschaften
 1990: Studies in the Islamic Exact Sciences, Syracuse University Press 
 1998: On the Contents and Significance of the Khāqānī Zīj by Jamshīd Ghiyāth al-Dīn al-Kāshī (Islamic Mathematics and Astronomy volume 84). Frankfurt am Main: Institut für Geschichte der Arabisch-Islamischen Wissenschaften
 1998: Astronomy and Astrology in the Medieval Islamic World. Aldershot UK: Ashgate/Variorum
 1999: (with Paul Kunitzsch and Richard P. Lorch) The Melon-Shaped Astrolabe in Arabic Astronomy. Stuttgart: Steiner.
 2008: "Al-Bīrūnī (or Bērūnī), Abū Rayḥān (or Abu'l-Rayḥān) Muḥammad Ibn Aḥmad", Complete Dictionary of Scientific Biography, Encyclopedia.com, [1970–80]

References 

 Van Dalen, Benno; King, David A.; Samsó, Julio; Kennedy, Nora Wallace; Kennedy-Scanlon, Michael, In memoriam Edward S. Kennedy (1912 – 2009) — Includes eulogy, list of publications
 King, David A., & Saliba, George (eds.), From Deferent to Equant: A Volume of Studies in the History of Science in the Ancient and Medieval Near East in Honor of E. S. Kennedy. Special issue of Annals of the New York Academy of Sciences 500 (1987), 569 pp.

See also 
 Islamic astronomy
 Science in the medieval Islamic world
 Otto Neugebauer

Historians of astronomy
Historians of science
1912 births
2009 deaths
American expatriates in Mexico
Lafayette College alumni
United States Army personnel of World War II
American expatriates in Iran
American expatriates in Egypt
American expatriates in Syria